John Sanders Counselman (February 18, 1880 – March 29, 1955) was an American college football player and coach, professor of mathematics, and civil engineer. He played for Virginia Tech with Hunter Carpenter. He also attended the University of Michigan. Counselman coached Cumberland in 1905, and for Samford (then Howard) from 1906 to 1908, finishing after just the first two games of the latter season. He is the first coach in Samford history. Counselman was selected as a substitute for the Washington Post's All-Southern team.

Counselman was a professor at the College of William & Mary and Georgia Tech. He also taught in high schools in Birmingham, Alabama and Gadsden, Alabama and was the superintendent of schools for Tallahassee, Florida. Counselman died of a heart attack on March 29, 1955, at this home in Gadsden.

Head coaching record

Notes

References

1880 births
1955 deaths
20th-century American educators
American civil engineers
American football halfbacks
School superintendents in Florida
Cumberland Phoenix football coaches
Samford Bulldogs football coaches
Virginia Tech Hokies football players
College of William & Mary faculty
Georgia Tech faculty
Schoolteachers from Alabama
People from Wythe County, Virginia
Coaches of American football from Virginia
Players of American football from Virginia